Dávid Haspra (born 6 November 2000) is a professional Slovak footballer who plays as a defender.

Club career

FC ViOn Zlaté Moravce
Haspra made his Fortuna Liga debut for ViOn Zlaté Moravce against Pohronie on 27 June 2020, during an away 0:1 defeat. Haspra was fielded in the starting line-up and played 90 minutes. He made two further appearances in two final subsequent rounds of the season.

At the start of the 2020–21 season, Haspra had extended his contract with ViOn by a year.

References

External links
 FC ViOn Zlaté Moravce official club profile 
 
 Futbalnet profile 
 

2000 births
Living people
People from Zlaté Moravce
Sportspeople from the Nitra Region
Slovak footballers
Association football defenders
FC ViOn Zlaté Moravce players
Slovak Super Liga players